
Mackenzie River may refer to:

Australia 

Mackenzie River (Queensland), a tributary of the Fitzroy River in Queensland
Mackenzie River (Victoria), in western Victoria, Australia, also called the McKenzie River, a tributary of the Wimmera River

Canada 

 Mackenzie River, the longest river in Canada
 Mackenzie River (Nova Scotia)

New Zealand 

Mackenzie River (New Zealand) in the South Island of New Zealand

See also 
 McKenzie River (disambiguation)
 SS Mackenzie River (1908), steamship on the Mackenzie River system